Darksiders is a 2010 hack and slash action-adventure video game developed by Vigil Games and published by THQ. The game’s inspiration is from the Four Horsemen of the Apocalypse, with the player taking the role of the horseman War. The game was released for the PlayStation 3 and Xbox 360 on January 5, 2010 in North America, January 7 in Australia, January 8 in Europe, and March 18 in Japan. The Microsoft Windows version was released in North America and Australia on September 23, and in Europe on September 24. A parallel sequel, Darksiders II, was released on August 14, 2012.

A remastered version of the game named Darksiders: Warmastered Edition was released on November 22, 2016 for PlayStation 4 and Xbox One and on November 29, 2016 for Microsoft Windows. A Wii U version was released on May 23, 2017, and a Nintendo Switch version was released on April 2, 2019.

Gameplay

In Darksiders, players control War, one of the Four Horsemen of the Apocalypse, in a third-person perspective. The world is split into separate locations with many areas initially inaccessible until later in the game. The center of the world, The Scalding Gallow, functions as a hub where War is given new objectives and paths to unlock new areas, many of which require the use of newly-gained abilities to progress.

Although War is initially limited to the use of his two-handed signature sword, Chaos Eater, he eventually obtains other weapons throughout the course of the game. He also has a Scythe, which he uses as his other main offensive weapon. Weapons have different combinations of attack that can be obtained throughout the game. Along with combos, players are encouraged to use countering moves, blocks, and swift dodging. Projectile weapons such as a revolver and a boomerang-style throwing blade can also be used. Objects scattered throughout the environment can also be used as weapons and projectiles. At a later point in the game, War gains the ability to summon a horse that provides faster movement and increased attack power.

Along with weapon-based attacks, War can also use an array of magic-based attacks, known as Wrath powers, that are both offensive & defensive in nature. The amount of Wrath powers available are determined through the Wrath meter. War's Chaos Form, which transforms him into a large, fiery and extremely resistant entity can be activated once War's Chaos meter is filled.

When enemies are near defeat, War can perform an elaborate and violent finishing move, instantly killing them. Some larger foes can be briefly ridden and steered into other enemies before being finished off. War eventually encounters large boss opponents that are both giant in size and deal heavy damage, and are themselves puzzle-based battles requiring certain methods and certain weapons to defeat them, and in some cases quick time button events to dodge or deal attacks.

Upon defeat, some enemies expel souls that provide different benefits. Green souls that fill the health bar, yellow souls that fill the Wrath meter, and blue souls that are the game's form of currency, and can be spent on new combo attacks, enhanced Wrath powers, power-ups, and potions. Also, there are artifacts littered throughout the world that can be exchanged for more blue souls, with bonuses for completing each set. Additionally, souls can be obtained in chests found throughout the world. Other items that can be located include Wrath Core and Lifestone fragments, whereupon collecting four, War's Wrath or Health, respectively, are permanently increased.

Plot

Story
Since the beginning of time, the kingdoms of Heaven and Hell have been at war. A mediator known as the Charred Council arose to maintain "the Balance" of order and stability. The Council created a warrior brotherhood, the Four Horsemen of the Apocalypse (War, Death, Strife, and Fury) to enforce their rules by punishing transgressors. Foreseeing that humans would become crucial to the Balance, the Council declared them a third kingdom, under their protection. Heaven and Hell agreed a truce and sealed it with the Seven Seals, to be broken only when the kingdom of Man had become strong enough to join the Endwar. Breaking the seals would bring about the Apocalypse, with the breaking of the final Seventh Seal calling the Four Horsemen to Earth.

The Horseman of War (Liam O'Brien) arrives on present-day Earth, where the Endwar appears to have begun: armies of angels and demons are engaged in battle, with mankind caught in the middle. Confronting the archangel Abaddon (Troy Baker) of Heaven's army, War is surprised to learn that the Seventh Seal has not been broken and the other Horsemen were not summoned. Abaddon is killed by the gigantic demon Straga (Troy Baker). War battles Straga and gains the upper hand, but mysteriously loses his strength mid-battle. He is saved from death by the Charred Council (Fred Tatasciore), who accuses War of siding with Hell and causing the Apocalypse prematurely. War demands a chance to find the real culprits; the Council agrees, but War is stripped of his powers and bound to a Council servant, the Watcher (Mark Hamill), who is enabled to kill him if he disobeys. War returns to a ruined Earth, where a century has passed since "the Destroyer" annihilated humanity and defeated the forces of Heaven. The stranded remnants of the angelic army have formed a resistance force called the Hellguard, led by Uriel (Moon Bloodgood).

The demon merchant Vulgrim (Phil LaMarr) tells War that to find the Destroyer, he will need to travel to the hellish Black Tower. Vulgrim advises War to seek advice from Samael (Vernon Wells), a demon lord imprisoned for challenging his master's dominance. After being released, Samael explains that four ancient monsters called the Chosen are the guardians of the Black Tower. He asks War to kill them and bring him their hearts so the Tower will open. War slays all four of the Chosen, although it is revealed that their purpose was not to guard the Black Tower but to prevent Samael's return. Samael, revitalised, honours his bargain and opens a pathway to the Tower. He also hints that the Council are keeping War weakened for their own purposes.

Arriving at the Black Tower, War finds Azrael (Keith Szarabajka), the Angel of Death, imprisoned. As War works to release him, Azrael confesses that he and Abaddon conspired to break six of the Seven Seals. The intention was to summon the demon lords to a council of war where they would be ambushed, throwing Hell into disarray. The six Seals would meanwhile be restored, eliminating all evidence. The two angels convinced Ulthane (JB Blanc), a mighty blacksmith from an ancient race, to break and reforge the Seals. However, Abaddon's death ruined the plan, and the Endwar began in earnest.

War frees Azrael and fights a rematch with the demon Straga, whose death causes the Tower to collapse. Azrael transports himself and War to the Garden of Eden, where War visits the Tree of Knowledge to receive a vision. In this vision, War sees that Abaddon went to Hell after his death and was offered the choice to "serve in Heaven or rule in Hell." Knowing he was doomed for punishment in any case, he chose to become the Destroyer. He also guards the unbroken Seventh Seal, which would otherwise call the Four Horsemen to Earth. War is also shown that the Charred Council was aware of the conspiracy; they allowed the Apocalypse to happen and summoned War themselves, knowing he would track down the conspirators to clear his name. War then sees himself slain with a glowing sword. Azrael deduces the sword is the Armageddon Blade, a weapon powerful enough to kill the Destroyer, which has been broken into shards; War gathers the pieces and takes them to Ulthane, who reforges the blade.

Uriel, Abaddon's former lieutenant and leader of the Hellguard, confronts War, whom she still believes guilty of launching the Apocalypse and causing Abaddon's death. She challenges him to the Death Oath, a duel to the death. War is victorious, but spares her life, and reveals the Destroyer's identity as the fallen Abaddon. Enraged, Uriel leads the Hellguard into battle against the Destroyer, but they are defeated, as in War's vision. War then enters the battle with the newly forged Armageddon Blade, refuses the Destroyer's temptation, and after a fierce battle succeeds in killing him.

War retrieves the Seventh Seal from the Destroyer, but is subdued by the Watcher, who knows that if War were to regain his strength, he would turn against the corrupt Council. Uriel intervenes, killing War with the Armageddon Blade as foreseen in his vision, thereby fulfilling their Death Oath. The sword also shatters the Seventh Seal, which restores War to life, and frees him from the Council's control, whereupon he destroys the Watcher. Uriel warns War that he cannot stand alone against the forces of Heaven, Hell, and the Council; he replies that he is not alone, as the other three Horsemen are seen descending to Earth.

Characters
The player character is War, first of the Four Horsemen of the Apocalypse. Along with the rest of the Horsemen, War is not aligned to Heaven or Hell but instead serves at the whim of the Charred Council, whose purpose is upholding the balance between the two forces. He maintains a strict code of honor and will battle any obstacle in his way. It is prophesied that War and the other Horsemen will descend upon the Earth once the Apocalypse begins.

Throughout the story, War is bound to and accompanied by The Watcher, an emissary charged by the Council to watch over and guide War on his journey. Because of his assigned role, he is constantly skeptical and cynical of War's actions, much to War's annoyance and often anger. He relishes his duty and enjoys needling War and bossing him about simply because he can. War later employs the guidance of Samael, once a mighty and feared demon, now imprisoned, who himself seeks vengeance against the Destroyer, the main antagonist of the story and leader of the victorious forces on Earth. Many other characters become central to the overall plot, recurring at times. Among these is Uriel, leader of Heaven's armies after their first leader, Abaddon, was killed during a major battle; now stranded on Earth, Uriel seeks revenge against those she believes responsible. Another recurring character is Vulgrim, a demon merchant who provides gear and abilities for War in exchange for human souls. Finally there is Ulthane, also known as the Black Hammer, an "Old One" who at first is hostile towards War, but the two quickly become allies; first after Ulthane aids War in entering the Griever's lair, then providing War with a magical revolver and re-forging the Armageddon Blade for him.

Related media
Creator Joe Madureira planned a comic book series and a possible film adaptation for the game. Madureira has been reportedly working on the screenplay and may sell the rights to a Hollywood studio. However, the rights belong to THQ Nordic, leaving the status of the project unknown.

Reception

Critical reception

Darksiders has received positive reviews. Aggregating review website Metacritic gave the Xbox 360 version 83/100, the PlayStation 3 version 82/100, and the PC version 83/100.

GameZone Dakota Grabowski gave the game an 8/10 on both PlayStation 3 and Xbox 360, saying that "THQ and Vigil Games did an outstanding job creating an intellectual property that has weight. The voice-acting is top-notch, the combat is exquisite, the replay value is high, and the world they have created is fascinating. Darksiders is a marvelous way to start out 2010". Being overall positive, IGN saw the elements of Darksiders as a combination of three separate game franchises. Devil May Cry, God of War, and The Legend of Zelda games have been used to compare to the style of Darksiders.

Sales
Darksiders has sold over 1 million units worldwide.

Sequels

THQ creative director Luis Gigliotti revealed in a 2009 interview with GameAxis that Darksiders would be a franchise. Darksiders II was released in August 2012. War's brother, the Horseman, Death, is the protagonist of Darksiders II.

A third entry in the Darksiders series was originally planned by Vigil Games, but the fate of its franchise was threatened due to financial complications. Its parent company, THQ, filed for bankruptcy in 2012. The company's assets were sold at an auction, excluding Vigil Games, which was shut down along with the parent company, THQ. Darksiders was purchased by Nordic Games in the final transaction of THQ's assets in April 22, 2013.

The third installment, Darksiders III, was developed by Gunfire Games, the team largely consisting of former Vigil Games employees and published by THQ Nordic. It was released in November 27, 2018. The game follows the Horseman Fury as the protagonist and is set during War's 100-year imprisonment.

References

External links

 
 Darksiders on MobyGames

2010 video games
Action-adventure games
Dark fantasy video games
Darksiders
Four Horsemen of the Apocalypse in popular culture
Video games about demons
Hack and slash games
Nintendo Switch games
Open-world video games
PlayStation 3 games
PlayStation 4 games
PlayStation 4 Pro enhanced games
Post-apocalyptic video games
Seven deadly sins in popular culture
THQ Nordic games
Video games about angels
Video games based on mythology
Video games scored by Cris Velasco
Video games scored by Mike Reagan
Wii U eShop games
Wii U games
Windows games
Xbox 360 games
Xbox One games
Single-player video games
THQ games
Video games developed in the United States